Virden is a provincial electoral division in the Canadian province of Manitoba.  It was created by redistribution in 1903, and was eliminated in 1989, when its territory was combined with Arthur to create Arthur—Virden.

Virden was located in southwestern Manitoba, on the border with Saskatchewan.  It was bordered to the south by the Arthur constituency.

List of provincial representatives

Former provincial electoral districts of Manitoba
1903 establishments in Manitoba
1989 disestablishments in Manitoba